Michael Lorenz may refer to:
 Michael Lorenz (veterinarian)
 Michael Lorenz (footballer)
 Michael Lorenz (musicologist)